Niclas Sandells (born 14 March 1984, in Jakobstad) is a Finnish middle-distance runner.  He competed in the 1500 metres competition at the 2012 Summer Olympics.

References

1984 births
Living people
Finnish male middle-distance runners
Olympic athletes of Finland
Athletes (track and field) at the 2012 Summer Olympics
Swedish-speaking Finns
People from Jakobstad
Sportspeople from Ostrobothnia (region)